Mitzi or Mitzy is a feminine given name of German origin. Originally a nickname for girls named Maria in German-speaking populations, Mitzi became a given name in its own right, even outside of Germany. Several early-20th-century American actresses chose it as part of their stage name, for example Mitzi Green and Mitzi Gaynor, increasing its popularity. In the United States, Mitzi first appeared on the Social Security Administration's list of the top 1000 most popular names for baby girls in 1930, peaked in 1955, and has since fallen out of favor, dropping off the list entirely after 1979.

People 
Mitzi Cajayon (born 1978), Filipino politician
Mitzi Cunliffe (1918–2006), American sculptor
Mitzi Gaynor (born 1931), American actress, singer and dancer born Francesca Marlene de Czanyi von Gerber
Mitzi Green (1920–1969), American child actress born Elizabeth Keno
Mitzi Hajos (1889–1970), Hungarian born American actress
Mitzi Kapture (born 1962), American actress
Mitzy Larue, a member of the National Assembly of Seychelles
Mitzi Mayfair (1914–1976), stage name of American dancer and actress Emylyn Pique
Mitzi McCall (born 1932), American comedienne and actress.
Mitzi Shore, co-founder and operator of the Los Angeles comedy club The Comedy Store and mother of comedian and actor Pauly Shore
Montgomery McFate (born 1966), nicknamed "Mitzy", cultural anthropologist and defense and national security analyst
Maria Reiter (1911–1992), known as "Mitzi", associated romantically with Adolf Hitler in the late 1920s
Mitzy (fashion designer) (born 1955), Mexican fashion designer born Cebedeo García Cárdenas

Fictional characters 

Mitzi, in the 1921 Broadway play Blossom Time
Mitzi, in the 1950 Agatha Christie novel A Murder Is Announced
Mitzi, in the 1932 film One Hour with You
Mitzi, in the 1994 film The Adventures of Priscilla, Queen of the Desert and the subsequent musical
Mitzi Mozzarella, the Animatronic Cheerleader Mouse in The Rock-afire Explosion Music Show
Mitzy, in the 1998 animated series The Secret Files of the Spy Dogs
Miss Mitzi, in the 2004 Peter Chelsom movie Shall We Dance
Mitzi, in the 1986–1993 series Under the Umbrella Tree
Mitzi, in the 2004 animated series Winx Club
Mitzi Nohara, the mother of Shin-Chan in the Funimation English dub of Crayon Shin-chan in 2005
Mitzi, a skunk in the third season of the animated television series Littlest Pet Shop
Spritzy Mitzi, in an episode of Doc McStuffins
Mitzi, in the life-simulation videogame Animal Crossing
Mitzi, in the 2012 psychological horror game The Cat Lady
 Mitzi, in the 2019 film The Queen's Corgi
Mitzi Schildkraut-Fabelman, in the 2022 film The Fabelmans, based on director Steven Spielberg's mother Leah Adler.

See also
Mitzie, the dolphin who played Flipper in Flipper (1963 film)
Mizzi (disambiguation)

References

Feminine given names